Zarrineh Rud Rural District may refer to:
 Zarrineh Rud Rural District (West Azerbaijan Province)
 Zarrineh Rud Rural District (Khodabandeh County), Zanjan province

See also
Zarrineh Rud-e Jonubi Rural District
Zarrineh Rud-e Shomali Rural District